Following is a list of chapters of the Delta Delta Delta or Tri Delta sorority.

Collegiate chapters 
This list includes both active and inactive collegiate chapters of Tri Delta. Active chapters are indicated in bold. Inactive chapters are shown in italic.

Notes

Alumnae chapters 
Following are the alumnae chapters of Delta Delta Delta.

Reference 

Lists of chapters of United States student societies by society